MTV Roadies is a youth-based reality show. It was launched in 2003 and airs on MTV India. The show is also digitally available on Voot.

In this show, a group of contestants travel to different destinations and participate in various tasks that challenge their physical, social and mental strength.

Overview

History
The show was created by Raghu Ram, Rajiv Lakshman and RJ Amit. They left the show in 2014. They told the media that they had done enough to popularise the show and wanted to give opportunities to the new generation to carry the show forward. With a 17-year history, it is one of India's longest running reality shows.

During the course of the journey there are vote outs, vote ins, eliminations and game changing twists. Eventually the contestant who manages to survive vote outs and succeed in the finale is chosen as the winner. The show has enjoyed relative success among the youth. When asked about the show, the executive producer said, "Roadies has travel, adventure, drama".

Format
The first two seasons had a cap on the daily budget allocated to the contestants. During the show, apart from learning about India's diversity, they were also given tasks to get to know each other. The tasks became more challenging from the third season onwards.

Since the fourth season, Battleground (2006-2009, 2014–present) later known as Graveyard (2010-2011, 2013-2014) the show introduced the choice wild cards.

In the fifth season, The "Advantage task" was introduced. The winner of the task would get an advantage in the vote out, which could be multiple votes or being the only one(s) to vote. That was the first time the show went international.

In the tenth season, a team of former contestants mentored by Raghu Ram were pitted against a team of fresh contestants mentored by Rannvijay Singha, who was the winner of the first version of the contest.

In the twelfth season, during the auditions, "Gang Leaders" were introduced. Four Gang Leaders had to hit a buzzer to express their interest in a contestant. Contestants in return had the option to choose which gang they would like to be a part of.

In the fourteenth season, bikes, which had been a common aspect of the show, were discontinued and the makers opted for a car. That continued into the fifteenth season as well and so on.

Season nineteen was introduced with a new concept of debut roadies and ex-roadies competing against each other for the title. Bikes, which had been a common aspect of the earlier seasons, were introduced again. That was the first season without the presence of Rannvijay Singha.

Across all seasons, vote outs, vote ins, immunity, eliminations, captaincy, twists introduced by the makers, and special appearances by guests like actors, sportspersons and musicians have been regular features of the show.

Series synopses

Notes	

 Prince Narula replaced Sushil Kumar for journey due to Kumar leaving the show for his wrestling training. 
 Nikhil Chinapa replaced Karan Kundra for journey after Kundra left the show due to work commitments. 
 Gurmeet Singh Rehal returns as guest gang leader for Gang Nikhil as he wasn't available for a day during journey.
 Harbhajan Singh was introduced as a judge present during auditions and occasionally during journey who holds powers. 
 Varun Sood substitute Raftaar as gang leader during journey after he leaves for few days due to work commitments.Later he replaced him due to Raftaar being medically unfit.

References

External links
 Roadies official website

 
Adventure reality television series
2003 Indian television series debuts
Indian reality television series